Taran (also Romanized as Ţārān) is a village in Aghmiyun Rural District, in the Central District of Sarab County, East Azerbaijan Province, Iran. At the 2006 census, its population was 369, in 94 families.

References 

Populated places in Sarab County